The Iron Wind is a 1980 fantasy role-playing game supplement published by Iron Crown Enterprises.

Contents
The Iron Wind is the story of Mur Fostisyr and its people, and their condition and corruption under the evil influence of the Iron Wind.

Reception
William A. Barton reviewed The Iron Wind in The Space Gamer No. 36. Barton commented that "an imaginative game master should be able to make much of The Iron Wind as an addition to his fantasy campaign - or as a campaign in itself. Non-D&Ders will have to do some extra work to fit it into their systems, but should find the result quite worth the time spent."

Andy Blakeman reviewed The Iron Wind for Imagine magazine, and stated that "this is a worthwhile campaign pack – suitable for any rules system, I might add, and free -standing of other Loremaster products."

Lester W. Smith and Rick Swan did a point/counterpoint review of the second edition of The Iron Wind in Space Gamer No. 75. Smith commented that "All things considered, I heartily recommend The Iron Wind as a fascinating setting for campaigning or as source material. Read it and you'll feel you've been there." Swan commented that "In spite of I.C.E.'s claim that The Iron Wind is a campaign module, it's not – at least not by my definition. This is just another background encyclopedia, and not a particularly original one at that. I admire the effort, but I can't shake the feeling that I've seen it all before."

Reviews
 Different Worlds #20 (March, 1982)

References

Fantasy role-playing game supplements
Role-playing game supplements introduced in 1980